Grindline Skateparks is an American company that designs and builds skateboard parks. It has designed and built over 400 skateparks worldwide, including the largest skatepark in America, Spring Park Texas.

History 

Mark Hubbard was working as a pool-building contractor. He helped with the construction of the Burnside Skatepark in Portland. Living in Seattle, he started to turn his friends' pools into half-pipes, and eventually created Grindline Skateparks with cofounder Dave Palmer. Grindline Skateparks was incorporated in 2002 by Mark Hubbard, who managed the company until his death on 8 June 2018.

In August 2014, Grindline Skateparks inaugurated the Spring Skatepark in Greenspoint, Texas, one of the world's largest skateparks.

In 2018, Grindline completely remodeled the Humboldt Avenue Skatepark in Chico. Tony Hawk shared his plan to copy the new Chico bowl at the Wilmington Skatepark he is developing.

Description 

Grindline Skateparks is specialized in building free-form shaped deep pools. Its creation process includes co-designing the skate parks with the local skaters. The company is based in Seattle.

The company has 32 employees (2018).

Skateparks built

References

External links 
 Official website

2002 establishments in the United States